Soran is a district and an independent administration of the Erbil Governorate, Kurdistan Region, bordering Iran and Turkey. Its main city is Soran.

Sub-Districts

Soran District is similar to a county, and the seat of government is in Diana, having previously been in Rawandiz.

There were five sub-districts in Soran, being Mergasur, Diyana, Khalifan, Rawandiz and Sidekan.

Recently, however, Rawandiz became a separate district.

References

Districts of Erbil Governorate